Saphia Azzeddine ( December 12, 1979 ) is a French naturalized Moroccan writer, actress, and screenwriter.

Biography 
Saphia Azzeddine lived in Agadir during her early days of life. At the age of nine, she went to live in France in the city of Ferney-Voltaire, on the border of Switzerland. She continued her studies, earning a classical bachelor's degree and a degree in sociology. Before moving on to writing, she worked as a journalist and screenwriter. In 2002, she interviewed the comedian Jamel Debbouze during his tour in Switzerland for a Geneva magazine. In 2005 she published her first, successful novel, Confidences à Allah , adapted a decade later by Simon Eddy and Marie Avril. In 2011, the film Mon père est femme de ménage was released, of which she is the writer and director. The film was an adaptation of her second novel which was published in 2009.

Works

Writing Style 
 Confidences à Allah Léo Scheer Paris
 Mon père est femme de ménage Léo Scheer Paris
 La Mecque-Phuket Léo Scheer Paris
 Héros anonymes Léo Scheer Paris
 Combien veux-tu m'épouser?  Paris
 Bilqiss Paris

Related items 

 Selma Dabbagh
Abbas Khider
Faïza Guène
Kaouther Adimi
Rodaan Al Galidi

References 

Moroccan writers
21st-century French writers
Moroccan actors
Living people
1979 births
French screenwriters
Moroccan screenwriters